Bewcastle is a civil parish in the Carlisle district of Cumbria, England.  It contains 20 listed buildings that are recorded in the National Heritage List for England.  Of these, one is listed at Grade II*, the middle of the three grades, and the others are at Grade II, the lowest grade.  The parish is almost entirely rural or forested.  It extends to the Scottish border, and four of the listed buildings originated as bastle houses (fortified farmhouses).  Most of the other listed buildings are houses, farmhouses and farm buildings, the others including a church, a former public house, and a monument.


Key

Buildings

References

Citations

Sources

Lists of listed buildings in Cumbria